This is a list of the members of the Australian House of Representatives in the 20th Australian Parliament, which was elected at the 1951 election on 28 April 1951. The incumbent Liberal Party of Australia led by Prime Minister of Australia Robert Menzies with coalition partner the Country Party led by Arthur Fadden defeated the Australian Labor Party led by Ben Chifley.

Notes

References

Members of Australian parliaments by term
20th-century Australian politicians